Eugene G. Saloom (September 22, 1934 – May 15, 2022) was a Democratic member of the Pennsylvania House of Representatives for the 26th District.  He earlier represented the 59th District in southeastern Pennsylvania. and was a member of the Mount Pleasant School Board. Saloom was born in Mount Pleasant, Pennsylvania.

In the House he distinguished himself by serving as the House Liquor Control Committee Chairman  and by being a staunch advocate for raising the speed limit to 65 miles-per-hour on the Pennsylvania Turnpike.

Saloom ran unsuccessfully in the Democratic primary for the House of Representatives in 1992. He died on May 15, 2022 at a hospital in Somerset, Pennsylvania from heart failure.

Business
Eugene G. Saloom operated a funeral home in Mount Pleasant, PA from 1960 through 2004.

References

External links
  Saloom Funeral Home

1934 births
2022 deaths
People from Mount Pleasant, Pennsylvania
Democratic Party members of the Pennsylvania House of Representatives